La Duchesse de Langeais  is an 1834 novel by French author Honoré de Balzac (1799–1850) and included in the Scènes de la vie parisienne section of his novel sequence La Comédie humaine. It is part of his 1839 trilogy Histoire des treize: Ferragus is the first part, Part Two is La Duchesse de Langeais and Part Three is The Girl with the Golden Eyes.  It first appeared in 1834 under the title Ne touchez pas la hache (Don’t Touch the Axe) in the periodical L'Écho de la Jeune France.

Plot
General Armand de Montriveau, a war hero, is enamored of Duchess Antoinette de Langeais, a coquettish, married noblewoman who invites him to a ball but ultimately refuses his sexual advances and then disappears.  Assisted by the powerful group known as The Thirteen, who subscribe to an occult form of freemasonry, General Montriveau finds the duchess in a Spanish monastery of Discalced Carmelites under the name of Sister Theresa.

Dedicated to Franz Liszt, this portrait of a vain representative of the noble families of Faubourg Saint-Germain, was inspired by the Laure Junot with whom Balzac had a failed romance.

Film adaptations
 La Duchesse de Langeais, 1910 French film by André Calmettes
The Eternal Flame, 1922 American film by Frank Lloyd
 Love (Liebe), 1927 German film by Paul Czinner 
 La Duchesse de Langeais, 1942 French film by Jacques de Baroncelli
 La Duchesse de Langeais, 1982 French television film by Jean-Paul Roux 
 La Duchesse de Langeais, 1995 French television film by Jean-Daniel Verhaeghe
 Ne touchez pas la hache, 2007 French film by Jacques Rivette

References

Books of La Comédie humaine
Novels set in 19th-century France
1834 French novels
French novels adapted into films
Novels by Honoré de Balzac